Shammond Omar Williams (born April 5, 1975) is a retired American-born naturalized Georgian professional basketball player. During his career he played in the NBA and in Europe. He is currently an assistant coach for the Old Dominion Lady Monarchs basketball team.

Collegiate career
After attending Fork Union Military Academy, Williams played college basketball at North Carolina under Dean Smith and later, Bill Guthridge. During the 1997-1998 season, he was a member of coach Guthridge's "Six Starters" rotation with Antawn Jamison, Vince Carter, Ed Cota, Ademola Okulaja and Makhtar N'Diaye. That season (his final college season), he averaged 16.7 points and 4.2 assists per game to go along with career averages of 10.7 points and 3.0 assists per game.

When Williams graduated from North Carolina, he held the following school records:
 Most Career Three Point Field Goals Made:  233
 Most Season Three Point Field Goals Made:  95
 Most Three Point Field Goals Made in a Game:  8 (tie)
 Highest Career Free Throw Percentage:  .849
 Highest Season Free Throw Percentage   .911

Williams also became a pioneer of the internet during his collegiate career. In 1995, Shammond Williams became the very first collegiate athlete to have a website dedicated to him on the World Wide Web. The website was developed by Seth Fleishman, and an archive of [ "Shammond's World"] is still available for viewing.

Professional career
Williams was selected in the second round, 34th overall, of the 1998 NBA Draft by the Chicago Bulls.  While he never played for the Bulls, he did play for the Atlanta Hawks, Seattle SuperSonics, Boston Celtics, Denver Nuggets, New Orleans Hornets, and Orlando Magic.

He played internationally for Unics Kazan of Russia (where he obtained Georgian citizenship) and for Winterthur FC Barcelona of the Spanish Asociación de Clubs de Baloncesto (ACB). He has played for the Georgia national team and was the Most Valuable Player of the 2005 EuroChallenge All-Star Game.

Williams signed a one-year contract with the Los Angeles Lakers on July 12, 2006.
After spending one season with the Lakers, Williams returned to Europe and signed with Pamesa Velencia for three seasons. Before the start of the 2009-2010 ACB regular season, Pamesa Valencia released Williams, whereupon he trained on his own in the United States. On November 9, 2009, Williams returned to Spain and signed with Unicaja Málaga.

In January 2011 he signed with Apollon Limassol BC in Cyprus. After finishing the season in Cyprus he signed with Sutor Basket Montegranaro in Italy.

Coaching career 
During the 2011-12 season, he attended practices of North Carolina's men's basketball team and in 2012 was among the candidates to join Roy Williams' staff at UNC. He was also a counselor at the Nike Elite Youth Skill Academies. On June 21, 2012, Williams was appointed an assistant coach of the Furman Paladins men's basketball team. In 2013, he moved to the Tulane Green Wave men's basketball team, where he served a three-year stint as assistant coach, followed by one year at Western Kentucky Hilltoppers men's basketball. On September 15, 2021, Williams resumed his coaching career by accepting an offer to join the Old Dominion Monarchs women's basketball team as an assistant coach.

Personal
He is a cousin of former basketball player Kevin Garnett of the Minnesota Timberwolves and Louis McCullough, who has played professional basketball overseas. He is a member of the Psi Delta chapter of Omega Psi Phi.
He is godfather to Mitchell Robinson.

References

External links
NBA.com Profile
Euroleague.net Profile

Basketpedya.com Profile
HoopsHype.com Profile
Profile On Pamesa Valencia Official Site

1975 births
Living people
African-American basketball players
American expatriate basketball people in Cyprus
American expatriate basketball people in Italy
American expatriate basketball people in Russia
American expatriate basketball people in Spain
American expatriate basketball people in Turkey
American men's basketball players
Apollon Limassol BC players
Atlanta Hawks players
Baloncesto Málaga players
Basketball coaches from New York (state)
BC UNICS players
Boston Celtics players
CB Murcia players
Chicago Bulls draft picks
Denver Nuggets players
FC Barcelona Bàsquet players
Liga ACB players
Los Angeles Lakers players
Men's basketball players from Georgia (country)
New Orleans Hornets players
North Carolina Tar Heels men's basketball players
Orlando Magic players
Point guards
Seattle SuperSonics players
Shooting guards
Sportspeople from the Bronx
Basketball players from New York City
Sutor Basket Montegranaro players
Tulane Green Wave men's basketball coaches
Ülker G.S.K. basketball players
Valencia Basket players
Western Kentucky Hilltoppers basketball coaches
21st-century African-American sportspeople
20th-century African-American sportspeople